Cophixalus (rainforest frogs or nursery frogs) is a genus of microhylid frogs. These are arboreal species with expanded toe-pads, endemic to Moluccan Islands, New Guinea and northeastern Queensland, Australia.

Species
As of December 2019, Amphibian Species of the World assigns 67 species to the genus Cophixalus.

The source column gives direct links to the sources used:
 IUCN description of species at International Union for Conservation of Nature Red List of Threatened Species. IUCN Red List categories are:
 - Extinct,  - Extinct in the Wild
 - Critically Endangered,  - Endangered,  - Vulnerable
 - Near Threatened,  - Least Concern
 - Data Deficient,  - Not Evaluated
 ASW description of species at Amphibian Species of the World.

References

External links

 AmphibiaWeb: Information on amphibian biology and conservation [web application]. 2008. Berkeley, California: Cophixalus. AmphibiaWeb, available at http://amphibiaweb.org/. (Accessed: June 13, 2008).
 Encyclopedia of Life taxon Cophixalus at http://www.eol.org.
 
 GBIF - Global Biodiversity Information Facility Taxon Cophixalus at https://web.archive.org/web/20080501142231/http://data.gbif.org/welcome.htm

 
Microhylidae
Amphibians of Asia
Amphibians of Oceania
Amphibian genera
Taxa named by Oskar Boettger